José Pasqualetti (born 27 September 1956 in Bastia, France), is a French former professional football midfielder and current manager. He formerly managed AC Ajaccio.

He was named FC Istres manager in April 2010.

References

External links
 

Living people
1956 births
Sportspeople from Bastia
Association football midfielders
French footballers
Footballers from Corsica
SC Bastia players
Olympique Alès players
Montpellier HSC players
Olympique Lyonnais players
Ligue 1 players
Ligue 2 players
French football managers
SC Bastia managers
CS Sedan Ardennes managers
AC Ajaccio managers
FC Istres managers
AS Béziers Hérault (football) players